The 2004 Soul Train Music Awards were held on March 27, 2004 at the International Cultural Center Auditorium in Los Angeles, California. The show was hosted by Alicia Keys and Babyface.

Special awards

Quincy Jones Award for Outstanding Career Achievements – Male
 R. Kelly

Quincy Jones Award for Outstanding Career Achievements – Female
 Janet Jackson

Sammy Davis, Jr. Award for "Entertainer of the Year" – Male
 OutKast

Sammy Davis, Jr. Award for "Entertainer of the Year" – Female
 Beyoncé

Winners and nominees
Winners are in bold text.

Album of the Year
 OutKast – Speakerboxxx/The Love Below
 Beyoncé – Dangerously in Love
 R. Kelly – Chocolate Factory
 Luther Vandross – Dance with My Father

Best R&B/Soul Album – Male
 R. Kelly – Chocolate Factory
 Dwele – Subject
 Anthony Hamilton – Comin' From Where I'm From
 Luther Vandross – Dance with My Father

Best R&B/Soul Album – Female
 Beyoncé – Dangerously in Love
 Erykah Badu – Worldwide Underground
 Mary J. Blige – Love & Life
 Aretha Franklin – So Damn Happy

Best R&B/Soul Album – Duo or Group
 B2K – Pandemonium!
 The Isley Brothers Featuring Ronald Isley – Body Kiss
 Kindred the Family Soul – Surrender to Love
 The Neptunes – Neptunes Presents Clones

Best R&B/Soul Single – Male
 Luther Vandross – "Dance with My Father"
 Anthony Hamilton – "Comin' From Where I'm From"
 Jaheim – "Put That Woman First"
 Pharrell  – "Frontin'"

Best R&B/Soul Single – Female
 Alicia Keys – "You Don't Know My Name"
 Ashanti – "Rain on Me"
 Erykah Badu – "Danger"
 Beyoncé  – "Crazy in Love"

Best R&B/Soul Single – Group, Band, or Duo
 Floetry – "Say Yes"
 B2K – "Girlfriend"
 The Isley Brothers Featuring Ronald Isley and JS – "Busted"
 Jagged Edge – "Walked Outta Heaven"

The Michael Jackson Award for Best R&B/Soul or Rap Music Video
 OutKast – "Hey Ya!"
 Beyoncé  – "Crazy in Love"
 Missy Elliott  – "Gossip Folks"
 Lil' Jon & The Eastside Boyz  – "Get Low"

Best R&B/Soul or Rap New Artist
 Chingy
 G-Unit
 Ruben Studdard
 Kanye West

Best Gospel Album
 Byron Cage – The Prince of Praise (Live at New Birth Cathedral)
 Donnie McClurkin – Donnie McClurkin... Again
 Marvin Sapp – Diary of a Psalmist
 Vickie Winans – Bringing it All Together

Performers
 The Isley Brothers and Kim Johnson (from JS)
 Michelle Williams
 Nelly
 Murphy Lee
 Jermaine Dupri
 Alicia Keys
 Outkast and Sleepy Brown
 R. Kelly
 Ruben Studdard
 Usher, Lil Jon, Fonzworth Bentley and Ludacris

References

Soul Train Music Awards, 2004
Soul Train Music Awards
Soul
Soul
Soul